Isabella Mercia McDonagh (3 January 1899 – 5 March 1982), also known as Marie Lorraine, was an Australian actress who often worked in collaboration with her sisters Paulette and Phyllis. Isabella, alongside her two sisters made history by owning and running a film production company, therefore becoming the first Australian women to do so.

She visited Hollywood in 1933 but did not elect to stay on and make a career there.

Early life 
Isabella Mercia McDonagh was born 3 January 1899 at Macquaire Street in Sydney Australia, becoming one of seven children born to John McDonagh, a medical practitioner, and Annie Jane (née Amora). Since her father was a surgeon to a theatrical company, she was familiar with the entertainment industry and as a young girl, showed an interest in acting. She entered the film industry with her sisters Paulette , writer and director of all their films, and Phyllis who became the art director, publicist and producer. She died on 5th March 1982.

Awards

 Isabella Mercia McDonagh was inducted onto the Victorian Honour Roll of Women in 2001.
 Isabella and her sisters Paulette and Phyllis were recipients of the 1978 Raymond Longford award (Australian Film Institute)

Partial filmography 

Joe (1924)
Those Who Love (1926)
The Far Paradise (1928)
The Cheaters (1930)
Two Minutes Silence (1933)

References

External links
 
 Marie Lorraine at Australian Dictionary of Biography
 

1899 births
1982 deaths
Australian film actresses
Australian silent film actresses
20th-century Australian actresses
19th-century Australian women